The Phi Epsilon Pi fraternity, active between 1904 and 1970 with a predominantly Jewish membership, was founded in New York City and eventually opened at least 48 chapters on college campuses across the United States and one in Canada. After several mergers it consolidated into Zeta Beta Tau in 1970.

Founding
The Phi Epsilon Pi (PEP) fraternity was established on November 23, 1904 at the City College of New York, CCNY (CCNY). Phi Epsilon Pi was incorporated in New York State on February 9, 1914 and became a member of the National Interfraternity Conference in 1921. The fraternity was founded on non-sectarian principles, but throughout the organization’s history, the membership was largely Jewish.  Its Founders were:
Max Shlivek
Alvin P. Bloch
Arthur Hamburger
Siegfried F. Hartman
Arthur Hirschberg
William A. Hannig
Abraham E. Horn

The fraternity’s first chapters were founded at the City College of New York, CCNY (Alpha, 1904), Columbia University (Beta, 1905), and Cornell University (Epsilon, 1911).

Expansion
By 1913, the fraternity started to expand outside of New York State. Much of this next wave of expansion came through absorption of local fraternities; many of these were older than the national fraternity itself.  For example, Mu chapter at the University of Georgia (1915) came from the E.D.S Society, founded in 1895, which had been the oldest Jewish local fraternity in continuous existence.

In 1930 Phi Epsilon Pi absorbed the Syracuse University chapter of Omicron Alpha Tau, a smaller Jewish fraternity that would disperse by 1934.  This chapter, formed in 1920 either merged with the existing and older Phi Epsilon Pi chapter on the campus, or re-established it. Four of ΟΑΤ's other chapters went to Tau Delta Phi.

By 1933, Phi Epsilon Pi’s total membership stood at 3,600. During World War II approximately 2,000 fraternity members served in the military, and most chapters closed. After the war, many chapters were reactivated, and new chapters opened as well, including one at McGill University in Canada, making ΦΕΠ an international fraternity. In 1954, the membership of the fraternity reached 11,132.

The Fraternity was the first fraternity to appropriate funds for activities outside of its own organization, with the endowment of $10,000 in 1925 to fund scholarships at the National Agricultural College in Doylestown, Pennsylvania.  The interest from this fund paid the annual expenses for young men interested in agriculture.

The Phi Epsilon Pi Foundation was created in 1945.

Symbols
The Fraternity's colors were purple and gold.

Its badge was a concave rectangle with couped ends, domed and with the three Greek letters ,  and  shown bendwise (angled to the lower right) in gold against a black background. The base was jeweled with sixteen pearls, four on each side around the perimeter.

The pledge pin was an elongated concave rectangle with its corners also couped, with a gold beveled border.  Its center was filled with purple enamel, with the symbols of a ducal coronet, a scimitar piercing it in a bendwise direction, and curved toward an open eye in the base.

The coat of arms is described as follows:
Arms: Argent, on a fess purpure (purple) a rising sun resplendent or (gold).  In middle chief, a Phoenician galley under sail and power on a conventionalized ocean all proper, guided by a mullet on the second in dexter, and in base a scimitar piercing the field palewise emerging in the center of a single loop of rope knotted with ends couped at top, all proper. Crest: a sword fesswise surmounted by a ducal coronet all proper under three mullets or. Below, a motto in Greek.

Mergers 
In 1932 three of the five existing chapters of Sigma Lambda Pi merged into Phi Epsilon Pi. These became the Alpha Nu chapter at Muhlenberg, the Alpha Omicron chapter at Ohio State and the Alpha Xi chapter at Boston University. Meanwhile, ΣΛΠ's Columbia chapter dissolved and its Rider College chapter continued as a local.

Kappa Nu merged into Phi Epsilon Pi on October 14, 1961. In this second national merger, Kappa Nu brought 17 chapters into the combined fraternity, while Phi Epsilon Pi added its 38 chapters. The Fraternity kept the Phi Epsilon Pi name through both of these mergers.

In March 1970, in a third national merger, Phi Epsilon Pi was absorbed by the Zeta Beta Tau fraternity.

Chapters
Chapters of Phi Epsilon Phi:

()

 Alpha - 1904 - City College of New York
 Beta - 1905 - Columbia University (inactive 1928-1958)
  - 1911 - University of Rochester
 Epsilon - 1911 - Cornell University
 Zeta - 1913 - University of Pittsburgh
 Eta - 1914 - University of Pennsylvania
 Theta - 1914 - Pennsylvania State University
 Iota - 1914 - Dickinson College
 Kappa - 1914 - New York University (Washington Sq) (inactive 1922-1949)
  - 1915 - New York University (Heights)
 Lambda - 1915 Rutgers University
 Mu - 1915 - University of Georgia
 Nu - 1915 - University of Virginia
 Kappa Delta - 1915 - Union College (inactive 1925)
 Xi - 1916 - Georgia Institute of Technology
 Omicron - 1916 - Tufts University
 Pi - 1916 - University of Maine (inactive 1925)
 Rho - 1916 - Rhode Island State College (inactive 1922)
 Sigma - 1916 - Brown University (inactive 1918)
 Tau - 1916 - Auburn University (inactive 1920)
 Upsilon - 1916 - University of Connecticut (inactive 1964)
 Phi - 1916 - Carnegie Institute of Technology (inactive 1922)
  - 1917 - University of Buffalo
  - 1917 - Union College
 Chi - 1917 - Syracuse University
 Gamma - 1920 - Northwestern University
 Delta - 1920 - Washington and Lee University
 Psi - 1920 - University of Illinois
 Omega - 1920 - University of Cincinnati (inactive 1935)
 Alpha Alpha - 1920 - Dartmouth College (inactive 1922)
 Alpha Beta - 1920 - University of Iowa 
 Alpha Gamma - 1921 - University of Michigan (inactive 1942-1957)
  - 1921 - University of Chicago (inactive 1934)
  - 1921 - University of Alabama
  - 1921 - University of California, Berkeley
  - 1922 - Tulane University (inactive 1956)
 Alpha Delta - 1923 - University of Minnesota
 Alpha Epsilon - 1920 - Johns Hopkins University
 Alpha Zeta - 1926 - Harvard University (inactive 1935)
 Alpha Eta - 1925 - University of Wisconsin (inactive 1937-1966)
 Alpha Theta - 1928 - University of South Carolina
 Alpha Iota - 1929 - University of Miami
 Alpha Kappa - 1933 - Western Reserve University (inactive 1955-1966)
  - 1933 - Alfred University (inactive 1956)
 Alpha Lambda - 19xx - University of California, Los Angeles
 Alpha Mu - 1930 - George Washington University (inactive 1952)
  - 1932 - University of Arkansas (inactive 1941)
 Alpha Nu - 1932 - Muhlenberg College
 Alpha Xi - 1932 - Boston University
 Alpha Omicron - 1932 - Ohio State University (inactive 1964) 
 Alpha Pi - 1933 - Louisiana State University (inactive 1958)
 Alpha Rho - 1933 - Ohio University
 Alpha Sigma - 1935 - University of Mississippi
 Alpha Tau - 1948 - Queens College (Long Island)
 Alpha Upsilon - 1949 - Memphis State College (inactive 1959)
 Alpha Phi - 1949 - North Carolina State College (inactive 1962)
 Alpha Chi - 1950 - University of Omaha (inactive 1955)
 Alpha Psi - 1951 - McGill University
 Alpha Omega - ?
  - 1952 - University of California, Los Angeles
  - 1952 - Wayne State University (Detroit) (inactive 1963)
 Beta Alpha - 1956 - University of Houston
 Beta Beta - 1957 - American University
 Beta Gamma - 1958 - Brooklyn College
 Beta Delta - 1959 - Rensselaer Polytechnic Institute
 Beta Epsilon - 1960 -University of Florida
 Beta Zeta - 1961 - Philadelphia College of Textiles and Science
 Beta Eta - 1961 - Indiana University
 Beta Theta - 1962 - University of Maryland - College Park
 Beta Iota - 1963 - Long Island University
 Beta Kappa - 19xx - California State University - Long Beach
 Beta Lambda - 1965 - Northern Illinois University
 Beta Mu - 1966 - Long Island University-C.W. Post
 Beta Nu -  - Bryant University
 Beta Xi - 1966 - Baruch College
 Beta Omicron - 1967 - DePaul University
 Beta Pi - 19xx - Western New England College
 Beta Rho - ?
 Beta Sigma - 1967 - Southampton College
 Beta Tau - 19xx - Widener University
 Beta Upsilon - 19xx - Polytechnic Institute of Brooklyn
 Beta Phi - 19xx - West Chester University
 Beta Chi - 19xx - Hofstra University
 Beta Psi - 19xx - Drake University

See also
 List of Jewish fraternities and sororities

References

Further reading

External links
 Zeta Beta Tau Fraternity Website
 Phi Epsilon Pi Fraternity Gamma Chapter Records; 31/6/3; Northwestern University Archives, Evanston, IL.
 Phi Epsilon Pi Fraternity Records; I-76; American Jewish Historical Society, Boston, MA and New York, NY.

Student organizations established in 1904
Student societies in the United States
Historically Jewish fraternities in the United States
City College of New York
Zeta Beta Tau
Defunct former members of the North American Interfraternity Conference
1904 establishments in New York City
Jewish organizations established in 1904